Frederick Francis Keen (14 July 1898 – 3 April 1990) was an Argentine first-class cricketer.

Keen was born at Laprida in July 1898. He made his debut in first-class cricket for Argentina against the touring Marylebone Cricket Club at Buenos Aires in December 1926, with Keen playing a second first-class match against the same opposition the following month. He was a member of the South American cricket team which toured England in 1932, making four first-class appearances on the tour. Across seven first-class matches, Keen scored 115 runs with a high score of 23, With his left-arm fast-medium bowling, he took 13 wickets at an average of 38.84, with best figures of 3 for 31. He later stood as an umpire in a first-class match between Argentina and Sir T. E. W. Brinckman's XI in 1938. He died at Buenos Aires in April 1990. His father-in-law was the English cricketer Launcelot Ward.

References

External links

1898 births
1990 deaths
Sportspeople from Buenos Aires Province
Argentine cricketers
South Americans cricketers
Argentine cricket umpires